The 2004 Triple J Hottest 100 was announced on 26 January 2005. It was the twelfth such countdown of the most popular songs of the year, according to listeners of the Australian radio station Triple J.

Voters were limited to 20 votes each: 10 via SMS (charged at 30c each) and 10 via the Internet (no charge).

U2's "Vertigo" placed at number 38, despite having not been played on Triple J.

Triple J presenter Craig Reucassel encouraged voters to vote for the Media Watch theme music on the condition that his counterpart Chris Taylor would do a nude run through the Big Day Out if it made the hottest 100. While announcing the count, Reucassel called number 7 for the Media Watch theme, initiating Taylor on a streak through the music festival. Upon Taylor's return, Richard Kingsmill explained that Media Watch was ineligible due to not being recorded in 2004 and announced the real number 7. Missy Higgins was also in the studio and Reucassel goaded her into accepting a similar challenge should she win the Hottest 100. Higgins grew increasingly nervous as the count continued.

From early in the voting process, it became very obvious that Franz Ferdinand's "Take Me Out" would be the clear winner of this Hottest 100. Throughout the countdown, numerous references were made to this well-established fact, including announcers sarcastically claiming "Ha-ha! You thought they'd be #1" when "The Dark of the Matinée" was played at #50 as well a mock promotional piece heard in between in which votes for other bands such as Placebo were ignored in favour of Franz Ferdinand. When "Take Me Out" was officially announced as #1, it was reported that it had received more than double the votes of any other song. As with receiving more than double the votes, the presenters felt it sensible to also play a live version of "Take Me Out" directly after the studio version played at #1.

There were a record 475,000 voters that participated in the poll.

Full list
Note: Australian artists 

47 of the 100 songs are by Australian artists

Artists with multiple entries
The following individuals or groups had more than one entry in the Hottest 100:

Four entries
John Butler Trio (7, 25, 51, 93)
Scissor Sisters (23, 44, 58, 92)
Three entries
Franz Ferdinand (1, 29, 50)
Missy Higgins (2, 6, 49)
Eskimo Joe (3, 32, 62)
The Killers (4, 13, 39)
Little Birdy (8, 40, 78)
Two entries
Spiderbait (5, 20)
Powderfinger (9, 68)
The Dresden Dolls (12, 30)
Evermore (14, 57)
Grinspoon (16, 26)
The Streets (18, 19)
Jet (24, 89)
Dogs Die in Hot Cars (43, 84)
Regurgitator (52, 85)
Placebo (53, 95)
Xavier Rudd (56, 59)
Interpol (74, 76)
Dallas Crane (79, 83)

Top 10 Albums of 2004
Bold indicates winner of the Hottest 100.

CD release
The 2-CD set titled triple j – Hottest 100: Vol 12 Various Artists was released 2005-03-06. It is a compilation of 40 of the top 100 songs.

See also
2004 in music

Notes

2004
2004 in Australian music
Australia Triple J